Emanuel Beke (Beke Manó , 24 April 1862, Pápa – 27 June 1946, Budapest) was a Hungarian mathematician, specializing in differential equations, determinants, and mathematical physics. He is known for reforming the teaching of mathematics in Hungary.

Education and career
At the University of Budapest he received a mathematics-physics degree in 1883 and a doctorate in 1884.

In 1908 he was an Invited Speaker of the ICM in Rome. In 1914 he was elected a corresponding member of the Hungarian Academy of Sciences. In 1922 the official Council of the University of Budapest condemned his political activity, dismissed him from the University, and took away his membership in the Hungarian Academy of Sciences. After his dismissal he worked for a publishing firm.

Since 1950 the János Bolyai Mathematical Society has awarded the Máno Beke Commemorative Prize for teaching and popularization of mathematics.

Selected publications

Articles
"Die Irreducibilität der homogenen linearen Differentialgleichungen." Mathematische Annalen 45, no. 2 (1894): 278–294.
"Die symmetrischen Functionen bei den linearen homogenen Differentialgleichungen." Mathematische Annalen 45, no. 2 (1894): 295–300.
"Ueber die allgemeinste Differentialresolvente der homogenen linearen Differentialgleichungen." Mathematische Annalen 46, no. 4 (1895): 557–560.
"Zur Gruppentheorie der homogenen linearen Differentialgleichungen." Mathematische Annalen 49, no. 3 (1897): 573–580.

Books
 Differenciál- és integrálszámítás I–II (1910–1916) 
 Determinánsok (1915)
 Analytikai geometria (1926)

References

19th-century Hungarian mathematicians
20th-century Hungarian mathematicians
1862 births
1946 deaths